Daphnedale Park is a census-designated place in Modoc County, California. Its population is 129 as of the 2020 census, down from 184 from the 2010 census.

Geography
Two parallel primary streets, Saralane and Lucilane, access the Daphnedale subdivision from the northern boundary of the city of Alturas at W. 19th St.

According to the United States Census Bureau, the CDP covers an area of 1.3 square miles (3.5 km), 99.87% of it land, and 0.13% of it water.

Demographics

The 2010 United States Census reported that Daphnedale Park had a population of 184. The racial makeup of Daphnedale Park was 166 (90.2%) White, 2 (1.1%) African American, 6 (3.3%) Native American, 0 (0.0%) Asian, 4 (2.2%) Pacific Islander, 2 (1.1%) from other races, and 4 (2.2%) from two or more races. Hispanic or Latino of any race were 18 persons (9.8%).

The Census reported that 184 people (100% of the population) lived in households.

There were 76 households, out of which 23 (30.3%) had children under the age of 18 living in them, 37 (48.7%) were opposite-sex married couples living together, 7 (9.2%) had a female householder with no husband present, 2 (2.6%) had a male householder with no wife present.  There were 4 (5.3%) unmarried opposite-sex partnerships, and 0 (0%) same-sex married couples or partnerships. 23 households (30.3%) were made up of individuals, and 8 (10.5%) had someone living alone who was 65 years of age or older. The average household size was 2.42.  There were 46 families (60.5% of all households); the average family size was 3.09.

The population was spread out, with 40 people (21.7%) under the age of 18, 15 people (8.2%) aged 18 to 24, 34 people (18.5%) aged 25 to 44, 72 people (39.1%) aged 45 to 64, and 23 people (12.5%) who were 65 years of age or older.  The median age was 45.8 years. For every 100 females, there were 121.7 males.  For every 100 females age 18 and over, there were 97.3 males.

The homeowner vacancy rate was 1.8%; the rental vacancy rate was 4.5%.  130 people (70.7% of the population) lived in owner-occupied housing units and 54 people (29.3%) lived in rental housing units.

Politics

References

Census-designated places in Modoc County, California
Census-designated places in California